J.M. Aaroon Rashid (born 13 May 1950) is an Indian politician and former member of the Parliament of India, representing the Theni Lok Sabha constituency. Haaroon Rashid is a leader of Indian National Congress.

Early life 
J.M. Haaroon Rashid was born in Chennai on 13 May 1950 for Shri Jamal Mohideen and Smt. S.J.M.H. Bivi. J.M. Aaron Rashid attended Intermediate Educated at Sir Thiyagaraja College, Washermanpet, Chennai, Tamil Nadu

Political career
In March 1996, he entered into politics as a Member of Tamil Nadu Legislative Assembly for Villivakam constituency (1996–2001) from Tamil Maanila Congress. In 2001 he floated new party Tamizhaga Muslim United Jamaat and contested along with DMK alliance. Then he joined congress and got Lok Sabha seat for Periyakulam constituency in Tamil nadu and he won that Lok Sabha election in 2004 Elected to 14th Lok Sabha. He got 346,851 votes (49.51%) and he defeated strongman TTV Dhinakaran of ADMK by 2,155 votes in that election.

2009 elections
In 2009, Aaroon Rashid once again Indian national congress fielded him in THENI constituency in Tamil nadu and he got 340,575 and defeated Thanga Tamilselvan of All India Anna Dravida Munnetra Kazhagam.

Positions held

2004 
 Member, Committee on Energy
 Member, Consultative Committee, Ministry of Commerce and Industry
 Member, Consultative Committee, Ministry of Shipping
 Member, Committee on Government Assurances
 Chairman, Tamil Nadu Haj committee,  (2004 - 2009)
 Member, Tamil Nadu Wakf Board, (2004–09)

2006 
 Member, Joint Parliamentary Committee on Wakf

2007 
 Member, Committee on Energy

2009 
 Member, Committee on Health and Family Welfare
 Member, Committee on Official Languages
 Member, Consultative Committee, Ministry of Shipping
 Member, Tamil Nadu Wakf Board (2012–13).

2010

Member, committee on Home Affairs

Mullaiperiyar issue 
Theni, 15 December: Except for isolated incidents, usually controversial dam on Mullaiperiyar neighbouring Kerala with Theni district of Tamil Nadu, following stress, this was a normal life. However, after ten days of tense atmosphere, some violent incidents along the border areas of Kerala prevail. Police JM Aaron Rashid, Member of Parliament (Congress) were arrested, and 600 Congress Theni Parliament constituency they represent the procession tried to lay siege to the dam. MPs and the party office here on Aaron Palanichettipatti were rounded to the police.

See also
 K. Kamaraj
 M. G. Ramachandran
 Karunanidhi
 Rahul Gandhi
 Dayanidhi Maran
 E. V. K. S. Elangovan

References

External links 
 Members of Fourteenth Lok Sabha - Parliament of India website
 Tamilnadu Election 2012: AIADMK Retained The Sankarankoil Assembly
 https://web.archive.org/web/20120229123103/http://www.indianumbers.com/elections/results/Tamil-Nadu/Periyakulam
 http://www.indiastudychannel.com/India/loksabha/542-Periyakulam.aspx
 
 
 

1950 births
Living people
Indian Muslims
Indian National Congress politicians from Tamil Nadu
Lok Sabha members from Tamil Nadu
India MPs 2004–2009
India MPs 2009–2014
People from Theni district
United Progressive Alliance candidates in the 2014 Indian general election
Politicians from Chennai
Tamil Maanila Congress politicians